Oliver Gross (born 17 June 1973) is a former professional tennis player from Germany.

Career
Gross, the 1991 German Youth Champion, turned professional in 1993. The following year reached his first and only ATP Tour final, in San Marino, where he was defeated in straight sets by Carlos Costa.

He reached his highest career ranking of 60 in 1995, after reaching the quarterfinals in Munich and defeating number two Peter Sampras in Barcelona 1–6, 6–2, 6–3.

His best performance in a Grand Slam came at the 1998 US Open when he reached the round of 16. Gross came from two sets down in the opening round to beat 16th seed Albert Costa 2–6, 4–6, 7–5, 6–2, 6–4. He then accounted for dual French Open winner Sergi Bruguera 6–1, 6–3, 6–4 and in the third round had another five setter, defeating American wildcard Geoff Grant, 7–5, 6–7, 5–7, 6–3, 7–5. Playing for a spot in the quarter final, Gross was defeated by Swede Magnus Larsson 4–6, 5–7, 7–5, 2–6.

ATP career finals

Singles: 1 (1 runner-up)

ATP Challenger and ITF Futures finals

Singles: 16 (10–6)

Doubles: 1 (0–1)

Performance timeline

Singles

References

External links
 
 

1973 births
Living people
German male tennis players
Sportspeople from Hanau
Tennis people from Hesse